Novosibirsk Metro is a rapid transit system that serves Novosibirsk, Russia. It opened in January 1986, becoming the eleventh Metro in the USSR and the fourth in RSFSR. According to 2017 statistics, it is the third-busiest system in Russia behind Moscow and Saint Petersburg.

History
Plans for a rapid transit system began to be formed in 1962. Construction project was approved by Council of Ministers of the Soviet Union in November 1978, and on 12 May 1979 the first construction works began.

With wide experience in metro construction from the other metros of the USSR, it took seven-and-a-half years to complete work on the five-station launch stage of the system. The commissioning certificate was signed by the state commission on 28 December 1985, and Metro was triumphantly opened for passengers on 7 January 1986, becoming the eleventh Metro in the USSR and the fourth in RSFSR. Work quickly expanded to meet the original plans for a four-line 62 km network. However, the financial difficulties of the early 1990s meant that most of the work had to be frozen. Construction of new stations and tunnels resumed only in the 2000s. After the opening of 13th station, a further development was suspended again due to financing gap.

Overview 
The system contains 13 stations on two lines. The stations are vividly decorated in late-Soviet style. Of the 13 stations, seven are three-span shallow column stations, one is two-span shallow column station, four are single-vault stations. All of these stations have island platform.

Novosibirsk Metro transports about 206,000 passengers daily.

Lines

Stations

Network Map

Rolling stock 
Novosibirsk Metro rolling stock is represented by such models of metro railroad cars as Soviet 81-717/81-714 and Russian 81-540.2/541.2. Novosibirsk Metro uses 4-carriage electric trains.

As for 2022, the total number of trains is 26 (104 cars).

Gallery

References

External links 

 Novosibirsk metro in Mir metro/Metroworld website 
 Urbanrail.net information

 
Railway lines opened in 1986
Underground rapid transit in Russia
Rail transport in Siberia
Buildings and structures in Novosibirsk
Transport in Novosibirsk
Buildings and structures built in the Soviet Union